Sibongiseni Ngcobo (born 30 May 1995) is a South African politician who has been a Member of Parliament (MP) in the National Assembly since May 2019. A member of the Democratic Alliance, he is currently the youngest Member of the National Assembly. Ngcobo served as a DA councillor in the Richmond Local Municipality from 2016 to 2019.

Early life and education
Ngcobo was born in 1995 in Bulwer, KwaZulu-Natal. His parents were farmworkers. He holds a bachelor of arts degree in politics, philosophy and economics from the University of KwaZulu-Natal. Ngcobo is currently enrolled for an LLB at the university.

Politics
Ngcobo took an interest in politics while he was in grade six. While a student at the University of KwaZulu-Natal, he established the university's Democratic Alliance student organisation (DASO) branch. The university's student representative council initially dismissed his application for them to recognise the DASO branch, but he appealed to the university's Recognition Appeals Committee, and they recognised the branch, which led to it becoming a recognised organisation on the university's campus. Ngcobo was later elected to the university's SRC as a DASO representative.

In August 2016, he was elected as one of two DA councillors in the Richmond Local Municipality.

Parliamentary career
For the 2019 general elections, he was placed ninth on the DA's list of KwaZulu-Natal candidates for the National Assembly. He was ranked low on the DA's list of candidates for the KwaZulu-Natal Legislature. After the election, Ngcobo was nominated to the National Assembly. Ngcobo was sworn in as an MP on 22 May 2019. He is currently the youngest member of the National Assembly and the second-youngest MP of both houses. The youngest MP of both houses is Itumeleng Ntsube of the ruling African National Congress, who serves in the National Council of Provinces, the upper house.

As of June 2019, Ngcobo serves as an alternate member of the Portfolio Committee on Women, Youth and People with Disabilities.

References

External links

Living people
1995 births
Zulu people
People from KwaZulu-Natal
University of KwaZulu-Natal alumni
Democratic Alliance (South Africa) politicians
Members of the National Assembly of South Africa
21st-century South African politicians